Mount Doody is located in the Lewis Range, Glacier National Park in the U.S. state of Montana. Mount Doody is astride the same ridgeline as the Cloudcroft Peaks which are to the immediate northeast. Dan Doody was one of the first six rangers at Glacier National Park. Doody patrolled the Middle Fork drainages, using his own homestead as a headquarters. Later, because of his recognized hunting abilities, Doody became a park hunter skilled at removing "undesirable" wildlife from the area.

Geology

Like other mountains in Glacier National Park, the peak is composed of sedimentary rock laid down during the Precambrian to Jurassic periods.

Climate
Based on the Köppen climate classification, the peak is located in an alpine subarctic climate zone with long, cold, snowy winters, and cool to warm summers. Temperatures can drop below −10 °F with wind chill factors below −30 °F.

See also
 Mountains and mountain ranges of Glacier National Park (U.S.)

References

External links
 Dan Doody photo: NPS.gov
 Weather forecast: Mount Doody

Mountains of Flathead County, Montana
Mountains of Glacier National Park (U.S.)
Lewis Range
Mountains of Montana